Ordos (Mongolian:   Ordos), also known as Ih Ju, is one of the twelve major subdivisions of Inner Mongolia, China. It lies within the Ordos Plateau of the Yellow River. Although mainly rural, Ordos is administered as a prefecture-level city. Its population was 2,153,638 as of the 2020 census, and its built-up (or metro) area made up of Ejin Horo Banner and Kangbashi District was home to 366,779 inhabitants, as Dongsheng District (574,442 inhabitants) is not a conurbation yet.

Ordos is known for its recently undertaken large scale government projects including most prominently the new Kangbashi District, an urban district planned as a massive civic mall with abundant monuments, cultural institutions and other showpiece architecture. It was the venue for the 2012 Miss World Final.

When it was newly built, the streets of the new Kangbashi district did not have much activity, and the district was frequently described as a "ghost city" by several Western media outlets. However, by 2017, Kangbashi had become more populated with a resident population of 153,000 and around one-third of apartments occupied. In a Forbes article, Wade Shepard noted that "...of the 40,000 apartments that had been built in the new district since 2004, only 500 are still on the market, but it is not known if the apartments have been sold or just withdrawn from the market to bolster sagging prices.

Etymology
The area was known as the Ih Ju League, also spelled Ikh Juu Yeke Juu ayimaγ), from 1649 to 2001. It was redesignated a prefecture-level city and renamed to Ordos on 26 February 2001. "Ordos" means "palaces" in the Mongolian language. "Ordos" originally referred to a tribe belonging to the Yeke Juu (Ike Chao ‘great monastery’, i.e. Ih Ju or Guanghui Monastery) league and later included the tribe's area, hence the Ordos, or Ordus, the area within the big bend of the Yellow River. Mongolian ordu(n), ord ‘court, residence of a ruler; palace; camp’, also for 'camp bodyguards'.  According to Ramstedt -s  is a plural suffix; further: ordu, orda; Turkic orta ‘a center’; Mongolian > Turkish orda ‘camp’ > Hindi urdū > English "horde." 
The name is sometimes claimed to be related to the eight white yurts of Genghis Khan. Linguistically, the Ordos dialect of Mongolian is quite different from neighboring Chakhar Mongolian.

History

Prehistoric civilization 

At the southern end of the Ordos grassland, there is a river originating from Dingbian County in northwestern Shaanxi, flowing through the Otog Banner and Uxin Banner in Inner Mongolia, and then flowing from the east of Batuwan Village into the territory of northern Shanxi, after converging with Xiangshui River. It flows into the Wuding River, a tributary of the Yellow River, to the southeast. In the loose Mu Us desert, a “U” shaped river valley is washed out. This river is known as the Sarawusu River. Sara Wusu in Mongolian means "thick yellow stream" after the eponymous perennially yellow-colored local river; on both sides of the river is covered with swaying red willows, so people also call this river "Hongliu River". In 1923, French Jesuit Émile Licent first discovered a fossil of the Hetao people here. Since then, Chinese archaeologists have visited the site many times. The site is known today as part of the Shuidonggou site complex. A large number of cultural relics have been excavated from this site, some reportedly dating back as far as 100,000 years; however, the chronology of the site remains debated.  The material culture created by the Hetao people is now called "Salawusu" or "Shuidonggou" culture. After a comprehensive analysis of geology, animal fossils and stone tools, this culture was identified as the late Paleolithic culture.

Hetao civilization is the product of the integration of grassland culture and Yellow River civilization. Its long-term development and complex transmutation process, especially the relationship with Urad and Ordos Mongolian culture, also illustrates the relationship between Hetao civilization and Yellow River civilization. Hetao culture is one of the important components of the mainstream culture of the northern grasslands. In the grassland culture, the Hetao culture is both a source and a stream. As a source, Hetao culture has a historical accumulation of symbiosis with the northern grassland culture. As a stream, it is different from the Mongolian classic culture in the eastern part of Inner Mongolia, such as Hongshan culture and Khorchin Mongols culture. It has its unique development trend. In the origin of grassland culture, it is a source of the late Paleolithic period, which originated from the prosperity of ancient ethnic minorities. It was formed in the Qin, Han, Ming and Qing dynasties, and it is a cultural system of modern and contemporary civilization. It is an independent unit culture circle of grassland culture and a complete regional cultural system, which plays an important role in the composition of grassland culture.

Ancient history 
Before the Zhou dynasty, it was a nomadic area such as the Guifang and Lin Hu. In the Warring States Period, it was the Yunzhong County of the state of Zhao, and later belonged to the state of Qin. At the beginning of the Han dynasty, it was the front line of the Han–Xiongnu War. Emperor Wu of Han set up Shuofang County here. When Emperor Xuan of Han called the Huxie Chanyu to come, he became the residence of the Southern Xiongnu. Later, Hu Han lived in harmony, and the uprising of the Five Barbarians broke out in the Western Jin dynasty. Sixteen Kingdoms were the pre-Qin and post-Qin territory. The Northern dynasties belonged to the Northern Wei dynasty, the Western Wei dynasty, and the Northern Zhou dynasty. In the Sui and Tang dynasties, they were all territories. In the Tang dynasty, they were placed in the party, and the famous General Guo Ziyi once held this position. During the Anshi Rebellion, Emperor Suzong of Tang fled to this place.

Qin Zhidao and Qifang County 
Qin Zhidao was an important military road for Qin Shihuang to be supervised by Meng Tian from 212 BC to 210 BC. Qinzhidao starts from Yunyang Linguang Palace in the Xianyang military site, and goes to Jiuyuan County in the north. Qinzhidao passes through Ordos City, three Banners and one district, the Qinzhidao site protection unit is established in Ordos City. One of the northern border counties of the Han dynasty, the Sufang County was set up in the Western Han dynasty. In 127 BC (Yuanshou two years), Emperor Wu sent Wei Qing and Li Xi to send troops to attack the Xiongnu. Soldiers from Yunzhong County, west of Gaochun, and then westward to Fuli (now northern Gansu), regained the Hetao. The jurisdiction of the original Qin dynasty (commonly known as "New Qinzhong"), and the Sufang County in the south of the Yin Mountain, has been identified in the northwestern part of the current Otog Banner.

Tongwan City 
Tongwan City is located at the junction of Ordos City and Jingbian, Shaanxi Province. It was the capital of the Daxia Kingdom during the Northern dynasties and Sixteen Kingdoms 1500 years ago, In 407 AD, the Xiongnu leader Helian Bobo called himself “Tianwang, Great Chan Yu, occupied and located in the desert. The first year of Helian Bobo's kingdom called "Fengxiang", the 100,000 people of all ethnic groups, used the "steaming dust to build the city" method to build the capital in the south of the black water in the north of the SuFang (now Hongliu River). The city was built in 7 years. The city is 25 meters thick, with a height of 23.33 meters and a width of 11.16 meters.

Eight White Palaces 

The legend says that when Genghis Khan passed through the present-day Ordos area on his way to conquer the Western Xia Kingdom, he accidentally dropped his whip. Genghis Khan proclaimed on the spot that the water is good and grass is rich here, and he would like to be buried here. In August 1227, Genghis Khan died while waging campaign against the Tangut people of Western Xia. Ögedei Khan placed the relics of Genghis Khan in eight white felt tents for worship, collectively known as the Eight White Palaces. When the time came to Kublai Khan, he stipulated the ceremonies and ritual rules of the Eight White Palaces, and promulgated the sacred ceremonies. He held sacrifices throughout the year and became a great sacrifice for the Mongol Empire. In the Eight White Palaces, Genghis Khan and several ladies' coffins formed three white rooms. Genghis Khan used saddles, bows and arrows, milk buckets, historical materials books and reincarnation white horses that had been sealed by Genghis Khan to form the other five white palaces. And ordered the Darwinites to be guarded by the generation and generation, the Eight White Palaces is the holy place for the Mongolian people to worship. The Chagaan Sureg sacrifice is the big ritual of the Eight White Palaces in a year. Genghis Khan used the 981 horses to send to the heavens. And reincarnation of the white god horse with white satin hanging and offering. The Eight White Palaces is a movable hall and a symbol of the power of the Genghis Khan gold family.

Kublai Khan moved the Eight White Palaces to Khanbaliq (current day Beijing), the capital of the Mongol empire. In the 1750s, Mandulu Khan led the Ordos people into the area south of the Yellow River. Eight white rooms moved to Ordos. Soon, the son of Mandulu Khan came to dominate the grasslands, betrayed the golden family of Genghis Khan, and controlled the eight white rooms in their hands. Until the beginning of the sixteenth century, Genghis Khan's fifteenth generation of Sun Batu Mengke unified Mongolian ministries, and the eight white rooms were re-owned in the Genghis Khan gold family.

Qing dynasty

Six Banner's League 
In the sixth year of Qing Shunzhi (AD 1649), the Qing dynasty divided the Mongolian Ordos tribe into six Banners: the Ordos left-wing middle Banner (formerly the county king Banner), Ordos Left-wing front Banner (now Jungar Banner), the Ordos left-wing Banner (now the Dalat Banner), Ordos right-wing middle Banner (now Otog Banner), Ordos right-wing front Banner (now Uxin Banner), Ordos right wing Banner (now Hanggin), later, the addition of Ordos right wing before the Banner (formerly Zhasak Banner). Later, the Ordos' Six Banners have allied at Wang Ai Zhao, and named the Ikezhao League(Former name of Ordos city).

The Qing dynasty was an important period in the history of China's population development. At the beginning of the Qing dynasty, through the restoration and development of Kangxi, YongZheng, and Qianlong, three emperors, the population of the Qianlong dynasty broke through the 300 million mark. The contradiction between people and land is sharp, and a large number of the poor in the Mainland are forced by life pressure. They migrated to the West(Ordos), the Guandong, and the Nanyang(South sea and island of China). "Zou Xi Kou" means that thousands of people from Shanxi, Shaanxi and other places have migrated to Ordos, Guihua(Hohhot), Tumut, and Chahar since the Qing dynasty. "Zou Xi Kou" changed Mongolia's social structure, economic structure and way of life. Shanxi people account for a relatively high proportion of immigrants, bringing Shanxi's Jin culture to the central and western regions of Inner Mongolia.

Modern 
After the Republic of China, the special zone of Suiyuan was established, and later it was changed to Suiyuan Province, and Ikezhao League was established. After the Lugou Bridge Incident in 1937, Japan occupied most of northern China. In 1938, Inner Mongolia Bailing Temple, Guisui, Baotou and other places were successively lost. After the Japanese invaders occupied Baotou, they went to Ordos to coerce the princes of all ethnic groups and moved the eight white rooms of Genghis Khan to Baotou. At that time, the Iqzhao League leader Shagdur Zab and the flag princes vowed never to move east. Because the Genghis Khan eight white room is the god of all Mongolian beliefs. At that time, the situation was forced, but in desperation, the eight white room had to move west to the Xinglong Mountain in Gansu. On June 9, 1939, the Eight White Room embarked on a long road to the west. On June 21, the Eight White Room passed through Yan'an, and the Chinese Communist Party presented a wreath to the bier. On the couplet of the mourning hall, the two major ethnic groups of Mongolia and Han are more closely united, inheriting the spirit of Genghis Khan and fighting against the war, and the banner is the world giant. On June 25, the Eight White Room arrived in Xi'an, and along the street, the 200,000 people were welcome. The National Government held a grand national festival in accordance with the customs of the Mongolian nation. On July 1, 1939, the Eight White Room was placed in Xinglong Mountain, Gansu Province. In 1949, due to the chaos of the current situation, the government of the Republic of China moved the Eight White Room to the Qinghai Kumbum Monastery.

After the founding of the People's Republic of China, it has been transferred to the Inner Mongolia Autonomous Region. In 1954, the Central People's Government of the People's Republic of China moved the Eight White Room back to Ejin Hollow. [5]

In 2001, the State Council approved the withdrawal of Ikezhao League and the establishment of the prefecture-level Ordos City.

On June 8, 2016, the State Council approved the “Request for the Establishment of Kangbashi District in Ordos City” of Inner Mongolia Autonomous Region: agreed to set up Kangbashi District, and will be the Habagesh Street, Qingshan Street and Binhe Street in Dongsheng District of Ordos City. It is placed under the jurisdiction of the Kangbashi district.

Geography and climate
Ordos's prefectural administrative region occupies  and covers the bigger part of the Ordos Desert, although the urban area itself is relatively small. It borders the prefecture-level divisions of Hohhot to the east, Baotou to the northeast, Bayan Nur to the north, Alxa League to the northwest, Wuhai to the west, the Ningxia Hui Autonomous Region to its southwest, and the provinces of Shaanxi and Shanxi to the south.

The most populous municipality is Dongsheng which had a population of 582,544 inhabitants as of the 2010 census. Another urban area is the conglomeration of Kangbashi District and the adjacent township of Altan Xire. Kangbashi is to the north of the Wulan Mulun River, a tributary of the Yellow River, while Altan Xire is to the south of the same river.

The area of Ordos can roughly be divided into a hilly area in the east, high plateaus in the west and center, sandy deserts in the north and south, and plains at the southern bank of the Yellow River.

There are two large deserts in the territory of Ordos: Kubuqi Desert in the north and the Mu Us (Maowusu) Desert in the south.

Ordos features a cold semi-arid climate (Köppen BSk), marked by long, cold and very dry winters; very warm, somewhat humid summers; and strong winds, especially in spring. Most of the rain falls between July and September, with very little snow in winter; average annual evaporation reaches . Sunshine duration averages 2,700 to 3,200 hours annually.

Economy

Ordos is one of the most prosperous regions of China when measured by GDP figures. With a nominal per-capita GDP of US$34,352 and ppp per capita GDP of $65,192 in 2016, it ranks first among prefecture-level divisions in the entire Chinese mainland, and second in the PRC (including Hong Kong & Macau), behind Macau (Nominal GDP per capita: US$67,079; GDP (PPP) per capita: $96,148). It is extremely rich in natural resources, having one sixth of the national coal reserves. The pillars of its economy are textiles (wool), coal mining, petrochemicals, electricity generation, production of building materials, and bitcoin mining. An industrial park in Dalad Banner is home to one of the world's largest bitcoin 'mines' - really a massive server farm - owned by Beijing-based Bitmain.

China is building a third ICBM site near Hanggin Banner, Ordos City, in Inner Mongolia. It will hold more than 100 new DF-41 intercontinental ballistic missiles. It joins two other ICBM fields at Yumen and Hami.

Administrative subdivisions
Ordos Shi is divided into two districts and seven banners:

Kangbashi New Area

A large, sparsely inhabited urban real estate development has been constructed  from Dongsheng District. Intended to house a million people, it originally remained mostly uninhabited. Intended to have 300,000 residents by 2010, government figures stated it had 28,000. By 2017, Kangbashi had a resident population of 153,000 and around one-third of apartments occupied. It has been the subject of several speculative publication, including an illustrated feature series conducted by Al Jazeera in 2010.

Ordos Museum

In 2011, a 49,400-square-meter museum, entitled Ordos Museum, was opened in Kangbashi. The museum, designed by China-based architectural practice MAD Studio, focuses upon the history of the Ordos area, as well as on the culture and traditions of Inner Mongolia.

Transportation

Travel within Ordos City is primarily made by car or bus, using the city's network roads. Two tolled expressways, the G18 Rongcheng–Wuhai Expressway and the G65 Baotou–Maoming Expressway, provide connections with other towns and cities including Dongsheng.

In 2016, the Ordos railway station in the city opened. The station is on the Beijing-Baotou railway, the Hohhot-Ordos high-speed railway line, and the Baotou-West railway. High speed trains to the provincial capital of Hohhot are run on a daily basis. As well as slower speed trains directly to and from Beijing West railway station.

Ordos Ejin Horo International Airport is located in Ejin Horo Banner.

Demographics
In the 2000 census, there were 1,369,766 inhabitants:

See also

List of cities in China by GDP per capita
List of cities in China by population
Manhan folk song
Mausoleum of Genghis Khan
Ordos culture
Ordos International Circuit
Under-occupied developments in China

References

External links

 Official website
 Ordos Museum website (in Chinese)

 
Cities in Inner Mongolia
Articles containing Mongolian script text
Prefecture-level divisions of Inner Mongolia
Socialist planned cities